John Molyneux (fl. 1584), of Croxteth and New Hall, Lancashire, was an English politician.

He was a Member (MP) of the Parliament of England for Liverpool in 1584.

References

Year of birth missing
Year of death missing
Members of the Parliament of England (pre-1707) for Liverpool
People from Croxteth
English MPs 1584–1585